Charlotte Anne Montagu Douglas Scott, Duchess of Buccleuch and Queensberry, VA (née Thynne; 10 April 1811 – 18 March 1895) was a British peeress. A daughter of Thomas Thynne, 2nd Marquess of Bath, Charlotte married Walter Montagu Douglas Scott, 5th Duke of Buccleuch in 1829. They had seven children, including William Montagu Douglas Scott, 6th Duke of Buccleuch; Henry Douglas-Scott-Montagu, 1st Baron Montagu of Beaulieu; and the Royal Navy admiral Lord Charles Montagu Douglas Scott.

From 1841 to 1846, the Duchess of Buccleuch served as the Mistress of the Robes to Queen Victoria as a member of Robert Peel's ministry. Her husband, a staunch Conservative, also served in Peel's ministry, and the Duchess used the connection to gain patronage for her brothers. She and the Queen remained lifelong friends, with the latter serving as godmother to Charlotte's daughter Lady Victoria. The Duchess advised her on Scotland, and later converted to Roman Catholicism in 1860. She engaged in philanthropic efforts in Scotland, and died in 1895 at Ditton Park.

Family and early life
Lady Charlotte Anne Thynne was born at the Thynne family seat of Longleat in Wiltshire on 10 April 1811. She was the youngest daughter and tenth child of Thomas Thynne, 2nd Marquess of Bath and the Hon. Isabella Elizabeth Byng, daughter of George Byng, 4th Viscount Torrington. Her siblings included Henry Thynne, 3rd Marquess of Bath; Elizabeth Campbell, Countess Cawdor and Louisa Lascelles, Countess of Harewood.

Marriage

On 13 March 1829 Charlotte married Walter Montagu Douglas Scott, 5th Duke of Buccleuch at St George's, Hanover Square, London, becoming Duchess of Buccleuch and Queensberry. He had succeeded to the dukedom at the age of thirteen upon his father's death, and was five years older than his wife. According to the contemporary journal The Lady's Realm, their "romantic" engagement resulted when the young Duke visited her father and met Lady Charlotte. Upon their parting, he saw tears in her eyes which prompted him to turn his coach around and approach her father directly to ask for her hand in marriage. The couple would produce three daughters and four sons. Among their children were William Montagu Douglas Scott, 6th Duke of Buccleuch and Henry Douglas-Scott-Montagu, 1st Baron Montagu of Beaulieu.

Later life
In 1841, she succeeded the Duchess of Sutherland as Mistress of the Robes to Queen Victoria. The new prime minister, Robert Peel, personally selected her to be a member of his newly formed ministry. The post would later also be filled by her daughter-in-law Louisa. Her husband was a staunch Conservative and became Lord Privy Seal in Peel's ministry from 1842 to 1846; the Duchess used the connection to help her brothers gain patronage.

The Duchess of Buccleuch and Queen Victoria were lifelong friends, with the monarch describing the Duchess as "an agreeable, sensible, clever little person." In 1842 at Buckingham Palace, during Queen Victoria's preparations to visit Scotland, the Duchess helped advise her on the country. The Duke and Duchess helped entertain the Queen and Prince Albert when they arrived at Dalkeith. The historian Alex Tyrrell writes that the Duchess helped "consolidate Conservative influence in the royal household and counteract memories of the Bedchamber Crisis." The Queen stood as godmother for the Duchess's eldest daughter Victoria Alexandrine, who was christened at Buckingham Palace in April 1845. The Montagu-Douglas-Scotts were patrons of the artist Robert Thorburn, and commissioned him to paint several portraits of the Duchess, including a double portrait of her and Lady Victoria; this was given to Queen Victoria in 1847.

The Duchess of Buccleuch resigned the post of Mistress of the Robes in 1846, and was succeeded by the Duchess of Sutherland. She was a member of the Royal Order of Victoria and Albert, Third Class.

The Duchess's high church faith was an influence of her brother Revd Lord John Thynne, who was high church canon of Westminster Abbey. She and her husband built St Mary the Virgin, an Episcopal church in Dalkeith. To the Duke's distress, she converted to Roman Catholicism in 1860, "after struggling with her conscience for many years over the distress it would cause her Presbyterian husband." Soon after being married, she befriended Cecil, Marchioness of Lothian, another prominent Roman Catholic in Scotland. The two engaged in philanthropic work in Edinburgh together, and Lady Lothian helped persuade the Duchess to come to the decision to convert. Her brother Lord Charles also converted to Catholicism.

The Duchess enjoyed gardening and landscaping, and spent much time overseeing the gardens of Drumlanrig Castle. Her husband died in April 1884, and she moved to Ditton Park in Slough, Buckinghamshire. She was much affected by the death of her son Lord Walter; The Lady's Realm wrote that the Dowager Duchess "never recovered" from this. She died at Ditton Park on 28 March 1895, and was buried at Dalkeith Palace. She supported the religious congregation Poor Servants of the Mother of God until her death, and had engaged in other fund-raising activities as well.

The Duchess was portrayed by actress Diana Rigg during Series 2 of the television drama Victoria.

Children
The Duke and Duchess of Buccleuch had a total of seven children, three daughters and four sons:

Ancestry

References

Works cited

 
 
 
 
 
 
 
 
 
 
 

1811 births
1895 deaths
Converts to Roman Catholicism from Anglicanism
British duchesses by marriage
Ladies of the Royal Order of Victoria and Albert
Daughters of British marquesses
Mistresses of the Robes to Queen Victoria
Charlotte
Wives of knights